Citadel Počitelj  (Bosnian, Croatian and Serbian: Počiteljska tvrđava / Почитељска тврђава) is a castle in Bosnia and Herzegovina. This fortress was built by King Tvrtko I of Bosnia in 1383, and had a role of control a merchant rout from Bosnian inland, through the valley of the Neretva, to Drijeva trg and further to the Adriatic sea. The Ottoman Empire extended fortifications greatly, and developed a settlement, with a housings, bath and the mosque. Today, it overlooks a historic walled town of Počitelj.

References

Castles in Bosnia and Herzegovina
National Monuments of Bosnia and Herzegovina
Medieval Bosnia and Herzegovina architecture